Vanni Rodeghiero (born 9 February 1942) is a retired Italian javelin thrower who won a silver medal at the 1965 Summer Universiade and a bronze medal at the 1963 Mediterranean Games.

Biography
He winning the national title in 1963, 1965, 1966, 1968, 1974, 1978 and 1980, and after the end of his senior athletics career he continued to compete in masters athletics.

Achievements
Masters

See also
 List of Italian records in masters athletics

References

External links
 Javelin Throw ALL-TIME Rankings - Masters Athletics

1942 births
Living people
Italian male javelin throwers
Mediterranean Games bronze medalists for Italy
Athletes (track and field) at the 1963 Mediterranean Games
Universiade medalists in athletics (track and field)
Mediterranean Games medalists in athletics
Italian masters athletes
Universiade silver medalists for Italy
Medalists at the 1965 Summer Universiade